Oakwood Township is a township in Vermilion County, Illinois, USA.  As of the 2010 census, its population was 3,507 and it contained 1,518 housing units.

History
Oakwood Township was created in 1868.

Geography
Lakes in this township include Doughnut Pond, Highway Pond, Inland Sea and Missionfield Pond. The streams of Feather Creek, Glenburn Creek and Stony Creek run through this township.

Cities and towns
 Fithian
 Muncie
 Oakwood

Unincorporated towns
 Newtown

Extinct towns
 Belgium Row
 Bronson
 Brothers
 Bucktown
 Glenburn
 Missionfield
 Rumpler
 Ivanville

Adjacent townships
 Pilot Township (north)
 Blount Township (northeast)
 Catlin Township (east)
 Danville Township (east)
 Catlin Township (southeast)
 Vance Township (southwest)
 Ogden Township, Champaign County (west)

Cemeteries
The township contains five cemeteries: Johnson Hill, Jones Family, Jones Family, Pleasant Grove and Stearns.

Major highways
  Interstate 74
  U.S. Route 150
  Illinois State Route 49

Airports and landing strips
 Wilson Airport

Demographics

References
 U.S. Board on Geographic Names (GNIS)
 United States Census Bureau cartographic boundary files

External links
 US-Counties.com
 City-Data.com
 Illinois State Archives

Townships in Vermilion County, Illinois
Townships in Illinois